The 93rd Regiment of Foot was a short-lived infantry regiment in the British Army which was raised in 1780 to provide garrison troops for the West Indies during the American Revolutionary War.

The colonel-commandant of the regiment was Colonel William McCormick.

After several years stationed in Jamaica the regiment was disbanded in England after the Treaty of Paris in 1783.

References

Infantry regiments of the British Army
Military units and formations established in 1780
Military units and formations disestablished in 1783
1780 establishments in England